Paolo Rossi (born 25 December 1982) is an Italian footballer who plays for Reggiana at Lega Pro Prima Divisione on loan from A.S. Cittadella as a forward.

Career
Rossi started his career at hometown club Torino, where he played his first and only match in Serie A.

He then played for Gualdo of Serie C2, Pavia and Monza of Serie C1. In July 2008, he joined Cittadella of Serie B, but after 14 goalless league appearances, he re-joined Monza.

In the next season, he joined Reggiana.

External links
http://www.figc.it/nazionali/DettaglioConvocato?codiceConvocato=2088&squadra=4
http://aic.football.it/scheda/720/rossi-paolo.htm
http://www.reggianacalcio.it/index.php?mod=giocatore&id=00099

1982 births
Living people
Footballers from Turin
Italian footballers
Association football forwards
Torino F.C. players
F.C. Pavia players
A.C. Monza players
A.S. Cittadella players
A.C. Reggiana 1919 players
Serie A players
Serie B players
Serie C players
Italy youth international footballers